Rimmel Johnny Daniel (born 28 January 1991) is a Grenadian footballer who plays for Grays Athletic.

Career

Club
Daniel is a former youth team player with Gillingham who played as a defender. Daniel made six appearances for Waltham Forest in 2010 in the Isthmian League Division One North.

International
Daniel played for Grenada under-20's, and scored eight goals in Grenada's 17–0 win over British Virgin Islands in May 2008.

He made his debut for Grenada's senior national team in a warm-up match before the 2009 CONCACAF Gold Cup against Antigua and Barbuda on 1 July 2009 and marked the occasion with a goal. He was included in the squad for that tournament, playing as a substitute in two of Grenada's three group B games.

References

External links

1991 births
Living people
Footballers from Greater London
English footballers
Grenadian footballers
Grenada international footballers
2009 CONCACAF Gold Cup players
Association football defenders
Gillingham F.C. players
Waltham Forest F.C. players
Aveley F.C. players
Hornchurch F.C. players
Tilbury F.C. players
Grays Athletic F.C. players
Isthmian League players
English sportspeople of Grenadian descent
Grenada under-20 international footballers
Grenada youth international footballers
Black British sportspeople